A number of tools exist to generate computer network diagrams. Broadly, there are three types of tools that help create network maps and diagrams:

 Hybrid tools
 Network Monitoring tools
 Drawing tools

Network mapping and drawing software support IT systems managers to understand the hardware and software services on a network and how they are interconnected. Network maps and diagrams are a component of network documentation. They are required artifacts to better manage IT systems' uptime, performance, security risks, plan network changes and upgrades.

Hybrid tools 
These tools have capabilities in common with drawing tools and network monitoring tools. They are more specialized than general drawing tools and provide network engineers and IT systems administrators a higher level of automation and the ability to develop more detailed network topologies and diagrams. Typical capabilities include but not limited to:
 Displaying port / interface information on connections between devices on the maps
 Visualizing VLANs / subnets
 Visualizing virtual servers and storage
 Visualizing flow of network traffic across devices and networks
 Displaying WAN and LAN maps by location
 Importing network configuration files to generate topologies automatically

Network monitoring tools 
Some network monitoring tools generate visual maps by automatically scanning the network using network discovery protocols. The maps are ideally suited for viewing network monitoring status and issues visually. Typical capabilities include but not limited to:
 Automatically scanning the network using SNMP, WMI, etc.
 Scanning Windows and Unix servers
 Scanning virtual hosts
 Scanning routing protocols
 Scanning connection speeds
 Performing scheduled scans
 Tracking changes to the network

Drawing tools 
These tools help users to create network topology diagrams by adding icons to a canvas and using lines and connectors to draw linkages between nodes. This category of tools is similar to general drawing and paint tools. Typical capabilities include but not limited to:
 Libraries of icons for devices 
 Ability to add shapes and annotations to maps
 Ability to create free-form diagrams

List of network monitoring tools that generate network maps 
Some notable tools (may not be an exhaustive list):

List of drawing tools 
Some notable tools (may not be an exhaustive list):

See also 
Computer network diagram

External links 

 
 

Computer networking